Vinson Valega (born March 12, 1965 in Silver Spring, Maryland) is a jazz musician, composer, media producer, and website designer who resides in New York City. Valega is also involved in environmental issues and progressive activism.

Biography
 Valega grew up in a musical family in Olney, Maryland, studying classical piano from age seven until switching to the drums when he was 12. He played drums for three years in the All-County Jazz Ensemble during high school and subsequently held the drum chair in the University of Pennsylvania Big Band during college. After graduating from UPENN with a B.A. in Economics, Valega moved to New York City in the early 1990s to study music at the Mannes College of Music in Manhattan, where he studied with Marvin Smith (of The Tonight Show Band), Vernel Fournier, and Norm Freeman (of the New York Philharmonic).

Valega has performed in many clubs in the New York Metropolitan area, including the Blue Note, Smoke, The Jazz Gallery, 55 Bar, Birdland, Smalls, Cornelia Street Cafe, Cleopatra's Needle, and Trumpets of Montclair, NJ. A composer, Valega also teaches privately and served on the staff of the Stanford Jazz Workshop in California from 1999 to 2001. He has toured throughout North America and Europe with his groups and others, and he appears on Matthew Fries' CD, Song For Today (TCB) and the Ganz Brother's release, First Steps (Extravaganza). Valega also has four CDs out as a leader, Biophilia, Awake, Consilience, and Live@147.

In addition, Valega has also worked with or played along with many of the great musicians in jazz, such as Grover Washington, Jr., Dakota Staton, Clarke Terry, James Williams, Donald Brown, Harold Mabern, Jr., Jamil Nasser, Ron McClure, Bob Mintzer, Russell Malone, Peter Bernstein, Mark Turner, Terell Stafford, Eric Alexander, Jim Rotundi, David Hazeltine, Joel Frahm, Dena DeRose, Vincent Herring, and Candido Camero, among others.

Since 1998, Valega has been married to artist Sharon Louden.

References

 "...traditional jazz styles are merged with modern songwriting to create an engaging new whole. The interplay between all of the musicians is quite organic..and highly successful in creating a plethora of colors, while bridging the gap between divergent styles." JazzChicago.net (2010)
 "On Biophila, Valega’s tour de force, 'A Moment of Silence,' is a challenging, shape-shifting number that puts the entire ensemble through its paces." Jazz Times (2010)
 "There is a lot to love on Biophilia, if for no other reason than to hear a band truly listening to each other. That is an art that should never be taken for granted. Anton Denner's flute is magical, adding pure beauty to the Duke Ellington masterpiece, 'Sunset and the Mockingbird.'" NY Culture Examiner (2010)
"Valega's ”d-ruminations” are colorful and deliberate as every part of his kit is skillfully used." AllAboutJazz.com (2004)
"Valega finds quirky ways of laying down the groove, coloring it with subtle polyrhythms and syncopation." Cadence Magazine (2004)
"Valega’s drumming continually evolves, steady rhythmically but given to frequent tonal shifts which create new environments which his bandmates respond to with snap reflexes." Philadelphia City Paper online (2005)
"The reality of jazz in the 21st century is that there are many talented players, but not enough long term collaborations between musicians sharing common musical values and a similar vision. The Vinson Valega Trio seeks to defy this trend, using its five years as a working group to carefully construct a book of original and standard songs that reflects their extensive experience together while keeping in tune with each member’s inventive style." The Villager, New York City (2005)
"The album (Consilience) is filled with energized rhythms, smooth melodic structures and understated harmonies; many of which are not only surprising, but are also thought-provoking. There are mind-blowing solos as well as well-rounded augmentations of some of the finest composers and innovators in music. Jazzreview.com (2005)

Song samples

All compositions by Vinson Valega

External links
Official Vinson Valega website: Vinson Valega
 AllAboutJazz.com
Online essays: 
 Get Involved!
Music agency: Just Jazz

American jazz drummers
American jazz composers
American male jazz composers
Musicians from New York (state)
University of Pennsylvania alumni
American activists
1965 births
Living people
People from Olney, Maryland
20th-century American drummers
American male drummers
Jazz musicians from Maryland
20th-century American male musicians